The Cabot Performing Arts Center is located at 286 Cabot Street in Beverly, Massachusetts.

History 
For more than ninety years the Cabot Street Cinema Theatre has been an important part of the Boston's North Shore community. Harris and Glover Ware, two brothers and former vaudeville musicians from Marblehead, Massachusetts, built the Cabot eight years after the construction of their first Beverly theater, the Larcom Theatre. The Cabot was originally known as the Ware Theatre, when it opened in 1920 and was described as having “the most impressive auditorium of its size east of New York.” Erected with ballyhoo and great expense in 1920, it was immediately Beverly’s grandest playhouse. Large enough to accommodate any kind of entertainment, from silent pictures to opera, the Cabot was also grand enough—with its frescoes, filigrees, golden dome, and full balcony—to rival big-city show palaces. When it opened, announcements for the gala premier of the theatre boasted of a "$50,000 Austin Pipe Organ", which would be $ in  dollars.

The Cabot's architects were Funk and Wilcox, who had already made a name for themselves with the Athenaeum and the Strand Theatre (Dorchester, Massachusetts). Back then, movie palaces included fully equipped stages because film showings were often preceded by live acts—vaudeville. They were also built with orchestra pits for musicians who accompanied the silent films and the stage production.

Out of the 20,000 movie palaces entertaining America in 1920, the National Trust for Historic Preservation estimates that less than 250 remain. Up until January 2014, the Cabot maintained a grand tradition of elegant movie-going and live stage entertainment thanks to the Cabot's founding director Marco the Magi (Cesareo Pelaez, 1932 - 2012). He stated, “The total effect of a motion picture is conditioned by the environment in which it is shown.” Marco selected the Cabot’s “films worth seeing more than once;” he directed its attentive tuxedoed ushering staff, and designed its interior decor, including the fresh cut flower bouquets. Raised in the grand tradition from which the Cabot was born, he allowed movie-going to be an occasion where a community gathers to be entertained in an elegant environment.

Lowes 1960 - 1977 
Purchased in 1960 by  Loews, it was renamed the Cabot Cinema.

Le Grand David and his own Spectacular Magic Company 1977 - 2012 
In 1976, it was purchased by Le Grand David. Live performances by Le Grand David and his own Spectacular Magic Company were shown from February 1977 through May 2012. During that time the resident company also showed feature films "worth seeing more than once." On May 15, 2013, the owners/Le Grand David company announced that the Cabot was for sale.

After Le Grand David stopped performing, the theater continued to show movies until it closed in the winter of 2012/13.

Re-Opening 2014 
In the summer of 2014, the theater was sold, and has remained a venue for live performances and cinema. In November 2014, it reopened as a performing arts center, "The Cabot", offering a mixture of film, music, and performances. In 2015, Casey Soward was named Executive Director of theater.

Centennial 
In 2020, The Cabot will celebrate their centennial anniversary. Restoration of the theater's lobby is planned during the summer of 2020. The renovation is the latest in a series of projects that have been undertaken since 2014; these have included new seats, sound and lighting systems, HVAC, and a bar called Streetside.

References

External links
Official website
How ‘New Blood’ Brought Beverly’s Historic Movie Palace Back To Life

Theatres in Beverly, Massachusetts
Tourist attractions in Essex County, Massachusetts
Theatres completed in 1920
1920 establishments in Massachusetts